Carreglefn is a village in Anglesey, in north-west Wales., in the community of Mechell.

References

Villages in Anglesey
Mechell, Anglesey